The fifth season of Parks and Recreation originally aired in the United States on the NBC television network, from September 20, 2012 and concluded on May 2, 2013. This season consisted of 22 episodes. It stars Amy Poehler, Rashida Jones, Aziz Ansari, Nick Offerman, Aubrey Plaza, Chris Pratt, Adam Scott, and Rob Lowe, with supporting performances from Jim O'Heir and Retta.

Season 5 focuses on Leslie Knope (Amy Poehler) and her staff at the parks and recreation department of the fictional Indiana town of Pawnee. Although not having an overarching storyline like Season 4, this season details the aftermath of Leslie's role as a Councilwoman in Pawnee, and her rivalry with councilman Jeremy Jamm (Jon Glaser). Other storylines include Ben Wyatt (Adam Scott) and April Ludgate (Aubrey Plaza)'s career move to Washington D.C., Ann Perkins (Rashida Jones)'s attempts to get pregnant, the progress in Ben and Leslie's relationship, Andy's attempts at becoming a police officer, and Ron Swanson (Nick Offerman) meeting single mother Diane (Lucy Lawless).

Cast

Main
 Amy Poehler as Leslie Knope, is a council woman for the town of Pawnee, with a strong love of her home town, who has not let politics dampen her sense of optimism; her ultimate goal is to become President of the United States. Poehler departed from the NBC sketch comedy series Saturday Night Live, where she was a cast member for nearly seven years, to star in Parks and Recreation. It was only after she was cast that Daniels and Schur established the general concept of the show and the script for the pilot was written.
 Rashida Jones as Ann Perkins, a nurse and political outsider who becomes Leslie's best friend and also becomes more involved in Pawnee government through her friendship with Leslie. 
 Aziz Ansari as Tom Haverford, Leslie's sarcastic and underachieving subordinate who seeks to present himself as extremely hip and trendy and always has a scheme in the works.
 Nick Offerman as Ron Swanson, the deadpan parks and recreation director who, as a libertarian, believes in as small a government as possible. As such, Ron strives to make his department as ineffective as possible, and favors hiring employees who do not care about their jobs or are poor at them. Nevertheless, Ron consistently demonstrates that he secretly cares deeply about his fellow co-workers.
 Aubrey Plaza as April Ludgate, a cynical and uninterested parks department intern who eventually becomes the perfect assistant for Ron, but leaves the department with Ben Wyatt.
 Chris Pratt as Andy Dwyer, a goofy and dim-witted but lovable slacker; he is April's husband.
 Adam Scott as Ben Wyatt, Leslie's boyfriend, and later husband, who leaves Pawnee for Washington, D.C., to join a political campaign.
 Rob Lowe as Chris Traeger, an excessively positive and extremely health-conscious government official.

Starring
 Jim O'Heir as Jerry Gergich, a sweet-natured but painfully incompetent longtime city employee who is the main target of the office's petty unkindness, yet enjoys his life as the husband of a gorgeous woman and the father of three beautiful daughters.
 Retta as Donna Meagle, a no-nonsense administrative assistant in the department, who comes from a wealthy family, and frequently mentions her many boyfriends, both past and present.

Production

Filming
Portions of the season premiere "Ms. Knope Goes to Washington" and later episode "Leslie vs. April" were shot in Washington, D.C. in July 2012. These episodes featured cameo appearances from senators Barbara Boxer, Olympia Snowe and John McCain, and then Vice President Joe Biden.

The tenth episode of the season, "Two Parties", featured scenes shot in Indianapolis at Lucas Oil Stadium and St. Elmo Steak House in December 2012. This episode included cameos from Indianapolis Colts players Andrew Luck and Reggie Wayne and owner Jim Irsay, Indiana Pacers players Miles Plumlee and Roy Hibbert, and Newt Gingrich.

Writing
The fourteenth episode of the season, "Leslie and Ben", was initially written to serve as the season finale of a 13-episode run as the writers were unsure how many episodes would be commissioned. Eventually, 22 were ordered and the episode "Women in Garbage" was shown earlier in the schedule despite being written as one of the season's "back nine".

Episodes

 denotes an extended episode.

Reception

The fifth season of Parks and Recreation received highly positive reviews. On Rotten Tomatoes, the season has a 95% approval rating with an average score of 8.72 out of 10 based on 21 reviews. The site's critical consensus reads, "Heartfelt yet hilarious and snarky yet good-natured, Parks and Recreation remains one of the best sitcoms around and only continues to improve. Amy Poehler received her fourth consecutive nomination for the Primetime Emmy Award for Outstanding Lead Actress in a Comedy Series.

References

External links
Official Parks and Recreation site at NBC.com

5
2012 American television seasons
2013 American television seasons